Myosotis abyssinica is a species of plant in the family Boraginaceae. It can be found in Ethiopia, Sudan, Bioko Island (Fernando Poo), Rwanda, the Democratic Republic of Congo (Zaire), Uganda, Kenya, Tanzania, and Cameroon.

References

abyssinica
Taxa named by Pierre Edmond Boissier
Taxa named by George François Reuter